Black Gruya and the Stone of Wisdom is a 2007 Serbian comedy film directed by Marko Marinković.

Cast 
 Nenad Jezdić - Crni Gruja
 Nikola Kojo - Karadjordje
 Boris Milivojević - Bole
 Marinko Madžgalj - Ceda Velja
 Zoran Cvijanović - Zmago
 Dragan Jovanović - Omer
 Nebojša Ilić - Mladen
 Ognjen Amidžić - Radonja
 Dragan Bjelogrlić - Silberliber

References

External links 

2007 comedy films
2007 films
Serbian comedy films
Films set in Serbia